Cuisles is a commune in the Marne department in north-eastern France.

On 1 July 1973, the commune was merged with that of Châtillon-sur-Marne, but on 1 March 2006, was re-established as a separate commune in its own right.

See also
 Communes of the Marne department
Montagne de Reims Regional Natural Park

References

Communes of Marne (department)